The Joy Theatre (formerly the Rex Theatre) was a small cinema on Toronto's Queen Street East.  When built, during World War I the theatre had just 381 seats.  In 1941 it was renovated, adding air conditioning, boosting the number of seats to 427, and changing its name from Rex Theatre to Joy Theatre.

The cinema continued to operated for another 12 years.  After it stopped operating as a cinema it operated as a strip bar, and as of 2019 it was a restaurant.

References

Theatres in Toronto